Paracontias brocchii, also known commonly as the stone skink, is a species of lizard in the family Scincidae. The species is endemic to Madagascar.

Etymology
The specific name, brocchii, is in honor of French naturalist Paul Louis Antoine Brocchi.

Geographic range
P. brocchii is found in extreme northern Madagascar in Montagne d'Ambre National Park.

Habitat

Description
P. brocchii has no legs and no external ear openings.

Behavior
P. brocchi is terrestrial.

Reproduction
The mode of reproduction of P. brocchii is unknown.

References

Further reading
D'Cruze N, Köhler J, Franzen M, Glaw F (2008). "A conservation assessment of the amphibians and reptiles of the  Forêt d'Ambre Special Reserve, north Madagascar". Madagascar Conservation & Development 3 (1): 44–54. (Paracontias brocchii, p. 50). (in English, with an abstract in French).
Glaw F, Vences M (2006). A Field Guide to the Amphibians and Reptiles of Madagscar, Third Edition. Cologne, Germany: Vences & Glaw Verlag. 496 pp. .
Mocquard F (1894). "Reptiles nouveaux ou insuffisamment connus de Madagascar ". Bulletin de la Société Philomathique de Paris, Huitième Série [= Eighth Series] 6 (17): (Compte-Rendu Sommaire du Séance du 23 Juin 1894) 3–10. (Paracontias brocchii, new species, pp. 5–6). (in French).

Paracontias
Reptiles described in 1894
Reptiles of Madagascar
Taxa named by François Mocquard